Matakana River is in the Auckland Region of New Zealand's North Island. It flows south from its origins on the slopes of Tamahunga, Conical Peak and Pukematakeo, north of the township of Matakana, passing through the township and flowing into its estuary, which opens into Kawau Bay, facing Kawau Island.

The Matakana River hosts the annual Matakana Seagull Race, a boat race where the power is provided by British Seagull outboard motors

See also
List of rivers of New Zealand

References

External links
Photograph of Matakana River held in Auckland Libraries' heritage collections.

Rodney Local Board Area
Rivers of the Auckland Region
Hauraki Gulf catchment